Iotyrris is a genus of sea snails, marine gastropod mollusks in the family Turridae, the turrids.

Distribution
This marine genus occurs in the Western Pacific Ocean and off Australia.

Species
Species within the genus Iotyrris include:
 Iotyrris cerithiformis (Powell, 1964)
 Iotyrris cingulifera (Lamarck, 1822)
 Iotyrris conotaxis Abdelkrim, Aznar-Cormano, Buge, Fedosov, Kantor, Zaharias & Puillandre, 2018
 Iotyrris devoizei Kantor et al., 2008
 Iotyrris kingae (Powell, 1964)
 Iotyrris marquesensis Sysoev, 2002
 Iotyrris musivum Kantor et al., 2008
 Iotyrris notata (G. B. Sowerby III, 1889)
 Iotyrris olangoensis (Olivera, 2002)

References

 Medinskaya, A.A., & Sysoev, A.V. 2001. The foregut anatomy of the genus Xenuroturris (Gastropoda, Conoidea, Turridae), with a description of a new genus. Ruthenica 11: 7-14.
 Kantor, Y.I., Puillandre, N., Olivera, B.M. & Bouchet, P. 2008. Morphological Proxies for Taxonomic Decision in Turrids (Mollusca, Neogastropoda): a Test of the Value of Shell and Radula Characters using Molecular Data. Zoological Science (Tokyo) 25: 1156-1170
 Abdelkrim, J.; Aznar-Cormano, L.; Buge, B.; Fedosov, A.; Kantor, Y.; Zaharias, P.; Puillandre, N. (2018). Delimiting species of marine gastropods (Turridae, Conoidea) using RAD sequencing in an integrative taxonomy framework. Molecular Ecology. 27(22): 4591-4611

External links
 Bouchet, P.; Kantor, Y. I.; Sysoev, A.; Puillandre, N. (2011). A new operational classification of the Conoidea (Gastropoda). Journal of Molluscan Studies. 77(3): 273-308.
  Tucker, J.K. 2004 Catalog of recent and fossil turrids (Mollusca: Gastropoda). Zootaxa 682:1-1295.
 Worldwide Mollusc Species Data Base: Turridae

Turridae